Elmina is a 2010 Ghanaian film directed by Redeemer Mensah and was made in collaboration with Revele Films.

Plot 
The movie follows the people of Elmina, Ghana following the discovery of crude oil as they battle against corrupt multinational corporations.

Awards 
The film was nominated for an African Movie Academy Award in Nigeria in 2011, and voted number 35 on the Artinfo list of the 100 most iconic works of art from 2007–2012.

Cast 
 Doug Fishbone
Kofi Bucknor
 Akofa Edjeani Asiedu
 Ama K. Abebrese
 John Apea
 Kojo Dadson
 Redeemer Mensah

References 

Ghanaian drama films
2010 films